Urfeld am Walchensee is a village in the municipality of Kochel am See in the district of Bad Tölz-Wolfratshausen in Bavaria, Germany. It lies on the northwest shore of Lake Walchensee.

Famous people in Urfeld

(Source:) 
† Johann Wolfgang von Goethe — September 1786 
Ferdinand Graf von Spork — in the period 1875–1902
Hans Freiherr von Wolzogen — in the period 1883–1898
Hermann Rietschel — in the period 1886–1914
Berthold Kellermann — 1884
Georg von Vollmar — in the period 1889–1922
Wolfgang Heine — in the period 1905–1944
Otto Borngräber — in the period 1905–1928
Franz Seraph von Pfistermeister — in the period 1909–1912
Peter Emil Recher — in the period 1913–1948
Lovis Corinth — in the period 1918–1925
Paul Kalbeck — 1920
Arnold Zweig — in August 1923
Werner Heisenberg — in the period 1939–1976
‡ Colin Ross — April 1945
‡ ‡ Baldur von Schirach and Henriette von Schirach — in the period 1939–1945
Günther Lüders — in the period 1954–1975

Notes
† Goethe went incognito in Urfeld as "Johann Philipp Möller from Leipzig" at the beginning of his first trip to Italy on September 7, 1786.
‡ Committed suicide with his wife Elizabeth on 29 April 1945 in the house of Baldur von Schirach.
‡ ‡ Schirach and Ross were administrators of the Hitler Youth otherwise known as the Hitlerjugend.

References

External links
Biography: Baldur von Schirach
Colin Ross from German Wikipedia

Villages in Bavaria
Bad Tölz-Wolfratshausen